Pierre Boda (born 15 July 1993 in Camperdown) is an Australian Olympic short track speed skater. He competed at the 2011 World Short Track Speed Skating Championships in Sheffield, and at the 2012 World Short Track Speed Skating Championships in Shanghai. He competed at the 2014 Winter Olympics in Sochi, in men's 500 metres (short track speed skating).

In December 2016, Boda was named to Australia's team for the 2017 Asian Winter Games in Sapporo, Japan.

References

External links 
 
 
 

1993 births
Living people
Australian male short track speed skaters
Olympic short track speed skaters of Australia
Short track speed skaters at the 2014 Winter Olympics
Short track speed skaters at the 2017 Asian Winter Games
People educated at MacGregor State High School
21st-century Australian people